The Lopan (Russian and Ukrainian: Лопань) is a river that rises in Belgorod Oblast of Russia and flows across the Russian-Ukrainian border into Kharkiv Oblast where it joins the Udy in Kharkiv. The river Kharkiv is one of its tributaries.

Rivers of Belgorod Oblast
Rivers of Kharkiv Oblast